Stephanothrips is a genus of thrips in the family Phlaeothripidae.

Species
 Stephanothrips adnatus
 Stephanothrips albicollis
 Stephanothrips austrinus
 Stephanothrips barretti
 Stephanothrips boninensis
 Stephanothrips bradleyi
 Stephanothrips breviceps
 Stephanothrips broomei
 Stephanothrips buffai
 Stephanothrips carolinus
 Stephanothrips corticinus
 Stephanothrips ferrari
 Stephanothrips formosanus
 Stephanothrips fusiantennatus
 Stephanothrips howei
 Stephanothrips japonicus
 Stephanothrips kentingensis
 Stephanothrips leucocephalus
 Stephanothrips loricatus
 Stephanothrips malayensis
 Stephanothrips metaleucus
 Stephanothrips miscanthi
 Stephanothrips occidentalis
 Stephanothrips shikokuensis
 Stephanothrips takagii
 Stephanothrips thai
 Stephanothrips torajanus
 Stephanothrips toshifumii
 Stephanothrips uvarovi
 Stephanothrips whitcombi
 Stephanothrips yaeyamensis
 Stephanothrips zonatus

References

Phlaeothripidae
Thrips
Thrips genera